Erich Haaase (January 19, 1859, Berlin –April 24, 1894, Bangkok) was a German physician and entomologist.

Haaase was Director of the Royal Siamese Museum in Bangkok. He wrote Untersuchungen über die Mimicry auf Grundlage eines natürlichen Systema der Papilioniden. Erster Theil: Entwurf eines natürlichen Systems der Papilioniden - Bibliotheca zoologica (Stuttgart) 8(1), pp. vi + 1-12, pls. 1-2, 5-8(1891–92),  Die Indisch-Australischen Myriopoden. I. Chilopoden. Abhandlungen und Berichte des K. Zoologischen und Anthropologisch-Ethnographischen Museums zu Dresden 1886/87 (5): 1-118 and very many scientific short papers on insects Myriapoda and Chilopoda.
He died of dysentery.

External links
 
 HAASE Erich (19.01.1857 Koszalin - 24.04.1894 Bangkok) in: „Mały słownik przyrodników śląskich”
 

German entomologists
1859 births
1894 deaths